

The Hôtel Goüin is a hôtel particulier in Tours, France.

History
The mansion  was built in  the  15th century and is incorrectly  considered  to  have been the home of   Jean de Xaincoings, treasurer of the assets of  Charles VII. The house was the property  of  René Gardette, a descendant  of a family  of silk  merchants from Tours. The reworking  of the facade that dates from the 16th century includes the addition of the porch  and loggia and the left  wing in  early Renaissance style. The sub-basement contains Galloroman remains. 

The name Goüin is taken from a wealthy family of Breton bankers who purchased the building in 1738. The family undertook several improvements including the balcony over the rear courtyard, demolition of two houses on  the roadside, the enlargement of the south  yard, removal  of the south  balcony, and construction of the entry gate.  

In 1944 during  the Second World War the building  was almost  entirely  destroyed by bombs leaving only the facade intact. In the 1950s the main accommodation and the entrance were partially restored, while no traces of the garden and north yard remain. 

The building  once hosted the  Société archéologique de Touraine (Touraine Archeological  Society), and is now the home of the Goüin Museum. In 1967, on  the occasion  of the 40th congress of the French Federation of Philatelic Societies, the building  was featured on  the  0.40 franc postage stamp.

Gallery

See also 
Alexandre Goüin
Ernest Goüin
Eugène Goüin

References

Sources
Hardion, J.  L'Hôtel Goüin: Notice archéologique,  Société archéologique de Touraine, Tours (1901) (Gallica)
Abbot L. Bosseboeuf, Notice historique, avec planches et figures dans le texte,  Société archéologique de Touraine, Tours (1901) (Gallica)

External links 

 Musée Goüin web site
 French  government  listing

Buildings and structures in Tours, France
Museums in Indre-et-Loire
Monuments historiques of Indre-et-Loire